Lawrence Keyte (born 11 September 1963) is a Canadian modern pentathlete. He competed at the 1988 Summer Olympics.

References

External links
 

1963 births
Living people
Canadian male modern pentathletes
Olympic modern pentathletes of Canada
Modern pentathletes at the 1988 Summer Olympics
Track and field athletes from Boston